"Love Me for a Reason" is a song by Johnny Bristol. It was recorded most famously by the Osmonds, and released in 1974. Twenty years later, Boyzone covered the song. Both versions were successful, reaching the top 10 of the charts in many countries.

Original song and covers 
The original version by Johnny Bristol, from his 1974 album Hang On In There Baby, was released as a single on MGM in 1974, but "Love Me for a Reason" quickly became associated with another MGM act, the Osmonds. It was their last top ten hit on the Billboard Hot 100 singles chart, reaching number 10; it peaked at number two on the Billboard Adult Contemporary chart. In the UK Singles Chart it fared even better, spending three weeks at the top in August 1974. There was a lovers rock version of the song issued on Trojan records in 1976, credited to the Fabulous Five Inc (aka Fab Five Inc), that scored well in Jamaica and in the United Kingdom.

Track listing 
 7-inch single
 "Love Me for a Reason" — 4:02
 "Fever" — 3:15

Charts

Weekly charts

Year-end charts

Certifications

Boyzone version 

"Love Me for a Reason" was revived by Irish boy band Boyzone in 1994, released as the second single from their debut album, Said and Done (1994). The song was released in Ireland in late 1994 and was issued in the United Kingdom several weeks later, on November 28, 1994. It also became their breakthrough single, reaching number one on the Irish Singles Chart and number two on the UK Singles Chart. In the UK, it was the 19th-best-selling single of 1994 and received a gold sales status certification for shipping over 400,000 copies in the UK.

Critical reception 
Peter Fawthrop from AllMusic viewed the song as a "peppy tribute" to the Osmonds. Caroline Sullivan from The Guardian declared it as a "gem" from their debut album. In his weekly UK chart commentary, James Masterton wrote, "Be warned. This is just the first instalment of a cover battle over this song and could well be the start of a mini-Osmonds revival in the new year. For now, this cover of the Osmonds classic 1974 No.1 becomes the debut hit for the latest crop of lads to make a bid for teen stardom. The timing of the release is impeccable. I'm a sucker for a good pop record, well made and this ranks with the best of all of them, the harmonies are impeccable and the song has a proven track record. Now strongly in the running for the coveted seasonal No.1 slot, Boyzone are off and running." Alan Jones from Music Week said that the band "enter the overcrowded teen heart-throbs staker, with a competent if uninspired rendition of the old Osmonds' hit, which should win them plenty of children's TV slots, and a place in the bottom half of the Top 40."

Music video 
A music video was made to promote "Love Me for a Reason". It features the band performing the song in a basement, wearing black and white costumes. They are surrounded by large candelabras, curtains and pub height tables covered with candles. In between, a girl dressed in white appears.

Track listings 
 UK CD1 (Jewel Case)
 "Love Me for a Reason" — 3:41
 "Daydream Believer" — 3:06

 UK CD2 (Limited Edition Digipak w/Poster)
 "Love Me for a Reason" — 3:41
 "Daydream Believer" — 3:06

 Japanese CD single
 "Love Me for a Reason" — 3:39
 "Daydream Believer" — 3:07
 "Working My Way Back to You" (Original) — 3:41
 "Father and Son" (Original Demo) — 2:40

Charts

Weekly charts

Year-end charts

Certifications

References 

1974 songs
1974 singles
1994 singles
Songs written by Johnny Bristol
The Osmonds songs
Boyzone songs
Song recordings produced by Mike Curb
Song recordings produced by Ray Hedges
UK Singles Chart number-one singles
Irish Singles Chart number-one singles
MGM Records singles
Number-one singles in Israel
Polydor Records singles
Trojan Records singles